The Whitney Plantation Historic District is preserved by the Whitney Institute, a non-profit whose mission is to educate the public about the history and legacies of slavery in the Southern United States. The district, including the main house and outbuildings, is preserved near Wallace, in St. John the Baptist Parish, Louisiana, on the River Road along the Mississippi River. Habitation Haydel was founded in 1752 by Ambroise Haydel, one of the many German immigrants who colonized the river parishes in the 18th century. His descendants owned it until 1860. In 1867 it was sold to businessman Bradish Johnson who renamed it Whitney.

Overview
The plantation was a 1,800-acre property. Today, 200 acres are occupied by the museum which opened to the public for the first time in December 2014. (The remaining acreage was sold off by the previous owners in the 1970s.) The museum was founded by John Cummings, a trial attorney from New Orleans who has spent more than $8 million of his own fortune on this long-term project, and worked on it for nearly 15 years. The director of research is Dr. Ibrahima Seck, a Senegalese scholar specializing in the history of slavery. The grounds contain several memorial sites dedicated to over 100,000 women, men, and children who were enslaved in Louisiana. In addition, original art commissioned by Cummings, such as life-size sculptures of children, were added to help tell the history of slavery. The sculptures are representative of people born into slavery before the Civil War, many of whom were interviewed as adults for the Federal Writers Project during the Great Depression. These oral histories of hundreds of the last survivors of slavery in the United States were collected and published by the federal government, to preserve their stories. The transcripts and some audio recordings are held by the Library of Congress. 
Mr. Cummings donated the entirety of the museum and land to a non-profit in 2019.

Historic Structures
The French Creole raised-style main house, built in 1790, is an important architectural example in the state. The plantation has numerous outbuildings or "dependencies": a pigeonnier or dovecote, a plantation store, the only surviving French Creole barn in North America (ca. 1790), a detached kitchen, an overseer's house, a mule barn, and two slave dwellings. The complex includes three archaeological sites which have had varying degrees of exploration.

The 1884 Mialaret House, and its associated buildings and property, were added to the complex by later purchase. They help to reflect the long working history of the plantation. Some of the extensive land is still planted with sugarcane.

The Whitney Plantation historic district was listed on the U.S. National Register of Historic Places in 1992. It is one of 26 sites featured on the Louisiana African American Heritage Trail.

In popular culture

A scene from the 2012 Quentin Tarantino film Django Unchained was filmed in the rebuilt blacksmith's shop. The Atlantic magazine made a short documentary video about the museum in 2015, Why America Needs a Slavery Museum.

See also
Evergreen Plantation, also in the vicinity of Wallace
Louisiana African American Heritage Trail
National Register of Historic Places listings in St. John the Baptist Parish, Louisiana
Plantation complexes in the Southern United States
Rural African American Museum, Opelousas
History of slavery in Louisiana
List of plantations in Louisiana

References

External links

 
 
 

Houses completed in 1803
Creole architecture in Louisiana
Louisiana African American Heritage Trail
Houses in St. John the Baptist Parish, Louisiana
Museums in St. John the Baptist Parish, Louisiana
Historic districts on the National Register of Historic Places in Louisiana
Sugar plantations in Louisiana
National Register of Historic Places in St. John the Baptist Parish, Louisiana
Slavery museums
African-American museums in Louisiana
Slave cabins and quarters in the United States
Blacksmith shops